William Cunningham Dickie (2 May 1893 – 1960) was a Scottish footballer who played in the Football League for Chelsea and Stoke.

Career
Dickie began his career for his hometown club of Kilmarnock and after World War I he joined English side Chelsea. He spent two seasons with the Blues, making 40 appearances, before joining Stoke in May 1920. He played 14 matches for Stoke, helping the club gain promotion to the First Division in 1921–22. However, he was deemed surplus to requirements and he left for non-league Sittingbourne.

Career statistics

References

Scottish footballers
Kilmarnock F.C. players
New Brighton A.F.C. players
Chelsea F.C. players
Stoke City F.C. players
English Football League players
Scottish Football League players
Scottish Junior Football Association players
1893 births
Sittingbourne F.C. players
1960 deaths
Association football midfielders
Kilbirnie Ladeside F.C. players
Sheppey United F.C. players
Footballers from Kilmarnock